Joseph David Day (born 13 August 1990) is an English professional footballer who plays as a goalkeeper for Newport County.

Career

Rushden & Diamonds
Day began his career with Crystal Palace before joining Rushden & Diamonds in 2007. After spending time out on loan at Harrow Borough Day established himself in the Rushden & Diamonds first team.

Peterborough United
Day joined Peterborough United in April 2011. He spent most of the 2011–12 season on loan at Alfreton Town. He made his Football League debut for Peterborough United on 18 January 2014 in a 3–0 win against Tranmere Rovers.

On 28 August 2014, Day joined League Two Newport County on a one-month loan, making his debut versus Portsmouth on 30 August 2014. Following some impressive displays the loan period was subsequently extended to 28 November 2014.

Newport County
On 29 December 2014, Newport County  announced that they had agreed a full transfer with Peterborough United for Day for an undisclosed record transfer for the Welsh club with Day being contracted until the end of the 2016–17 season. Day was part of the Newport squad that completed the 'Great Escape' with a 2–1 victory at home to Notts County on the final day of the 2016–17 season, which ensured Newport's survival in League Two. On the 18 May 2017 Day signed a two-year contract to remain with Newport.

On 5 February 2019, whilst he was playing in a 2–0 FA Cup fourth round victory against Championship club Middlesbrough, Day's wife gave birth to twin daughters. Day said he knew that her waters had broken before the game, but he did not know she had given birth until after the match ended.

He was part of the team that reached the League Two play-off final at Wembley Stadium on 25 May 2019. Newport lost to Tranmere Rovers, 1–0 after a goal in the 119th minute.

Cardiff City 
On 27 June 2019, Day signed a two-year deal with Cardiff City on a free transfer following the expiry of his contract at Newport. He made his debut on the opening day of the season in a 3–2 defeat to Wigan Athletic as a substitute in place of Neil Etheridge.

Day joined League One team AFC Wimbledon on a six-month loan deal on 28 January 2020. He made his Wimbledon debut against Accrington Stanley on 1 February 2020.

On 4 January 2021, Day joined League One side Bristol Rovers on loan until the end of the 2020–21 season. Day made his debut that weekend in a 3–2 FA Cup third round defeat to Sheffield United. Although Day made a number of good saves, he was unlucky when a header he tipped onto the bar came back down, hitting Day and going in, this own goal opening the scoring for the Premier League side.

Day was released by Cardiff City at the end of his contract at the end of the 2020–21 season.

Newport County return
On 11 June 2021, Day returned to former club Newport County, signing a three-year contract two years after he had left the club to join Cardiff City. He made his third debut for Newport on 7 August 2021 in the starting line-up for the 1–0 League Two win against Oldham Athletic.

Career statistics

Honours
Peterborough United
Football League Trophy: 2013–14

Individual
 EFL League Two Player of the Month: April 2019

References

External links

1990 births
Living people
Footballers from Brighton
English footballers
Association football goalkeepers
Peterborough United F.C. players
English Football League players
National League (English football) players
Isthmian League players
Southern Football League players
Rushden & Diamonds F.C. players
Brackley Town F.C. players
Harrow Borough F.C. players
Alfreton Town F.C. players
Eastbourne Borough F.C. players
Newport County A.F.C. players
Cardiff City F.C. players
AFC Wimbledon players
Bristol Rovers F.C. players